Curtis Vincent Gómez (born March 26, 1953) is a senior United States district judge of the District Court of the Virgin Islands.

Education 
Gómez earned a Bachelor of Arts degree from George Washington University and his Juris Doctor from the Harvard Law School.

Legal career 
Gómez was an attorney with the law firms of Patton Boggs in the District of Columbia, and Dudley, Topper & Feuerzeig in the Virgin Islands. He served as a federal prosecutor in the Office of the United States Attorney for the District of the Virgin Islands.

Federal judicial service 
On November 25, 2003, President George W. Bush nominated Gómez to serve a ten-year term as a United States district judge of the District Court of the Virgin Islands. On April 4, 2004, a hearing on his nomination was held before the Senate Judiciary Committee. On April 29, 2004, the Committee reported his nomination favorably to the senate floor. On November 21, 2004, the full United States Senate confirmed his nomination by voice vote. Gómez assumed senior status on April 27, 2020.

References 

|-

1953 births
Living people
21st-century American judges
George Washington University alumni
Harvard Law School alumni
Judges of the United States District Court of the Virgin Islands
United States district court judges appointed by George W. Bush